Xiphotheata luctifera is a species of beetle in the family Cerambycidae. It was described by Léon Fairmaire in 1881. It is known from Papua New Guinea.

References

Pteropliini
Beetles described in 1881